'"Hello Central! Give Me No Man's Land" is a World War I era song released in 1918. Lyrics were written by Sam M. Lewis and Joe Young. Jean Schwartz composed the music. The song was published by Waterson Berlin & Snyder, Co. of New York City. Artist Albert Wilfred Barbelle designed the sheet music cover, which features a photo of Al Jolson next to a shadow of a child on the phone. Explosions in No Man's Land take up the rest of the red background. The song was written for both voice and piano. It was first introduced in the 1918 musical Sinbad. 
 
The sheet music can be found at Pritzker Military Museum & Library.

The song tells the story of a child attempting to call her father in No man's land. She is unable to reach him over the telephone because her father has been killed fighting on the Western Front. The chorus is as follows: 
"Hello Central! Give me No Man's Land,
My daddy's there, my mamma told me;
She tip-toed off to bed
After prayers were said;
Don't ring when you get the number,
Or you'll disturb mamma's slumber
I'm afraid to stand here at the 'phone
Cause I'm alone.
So won't you hurry;
I want to know why mama starts to weep
When I say, 'Now I lay me down to sleep';
Hello Central! Give me No Man's Land."

References

firstworldwar.com

External links
Albums "Hello Central! Give Me No Man's Land" can be found on

1918 songs
Songs of World War I
Songs with music by Jean Schwartz
Songs with lyrics by Sam M. Lewis
Songs with lyrics by Joe Young (lyricist)